The 2011–12 season will be AEL's first season back in the Football League following relegation from the Super League in 2011. It is Chris Coleman's first season in charge at the club. Coleman left Larissa on 9 January 2012 citing financial problems as the reason. "Over the last two or three months I've had to compromise myself because of the financial situation and it's made me unhappy"

Season review
See also 2011–12 Football League

Transfers

Transfers in

Transfers out

Squad

Current squad
As of 23 February 2012

Out on loan

Competitions

Football League
See also 2011–12 Football League

Results summary

Results by round

Fixtures & results

League table

Greek Cup
See also 2011–12 Greek Cup

Squad statistics

Appearances and goals

|-
|colspan="14"|Players who left Larissa on loan during the season:

|-
|colspan="14"|Players who appeared for Larissa no longer at the club:

|}

Top scorers

Disciplinary record

{| class="wikitable" style="font-size: 100%; text-align: center;"
|-
|rowspan="2" width="10%" align="center"|Number
|rowspan="2" width="10%" align="center"|Nation
|rowspan="2" width="10%" align="center"|Position
|rowspan="2" width="20%" align="center"|Name
|colspan="2" align="center"|Football League
|colspan="2" align="center"|Greek Cup
|colspan="2" align="center"|Total
|-
!width=60 style="background: #FFEE99"|
!width=60 style="background: #FF8888"|
!width=60 style="background: #FFEE99"|
!width=60 style="background: #FF8888"|
!width=60 style="background: #FFEE99"|
!width=60 style="background: #FF8888"|
|-
|1 || || GK ||Dimitrios Sotiriou || 2 || 0 || 0 || 0 || 2 || 0
|-
|3 || || DF ||Stylianos Venetidis || 1 || 0 || 0 || 0 || 1 || 0
|-
|4 || || MF ||Nikos Arabatzis || 2 || 1 || 0 || 0 || 2 || 1
|-
|5 || || MF ||Konstantinos Chatzis || 5 || 1 || 1 || 0 || 6 || 1
|-
|6 || || MF ||Konstantinos Nebegleras || 5 || 0 || 0 || 0 || 5 || 0
|-
|7 || || DF ||Dimitris Pliagas || 2 || 0 || 0 || 0 || 2 || 0
|-
|8 || || MF ||Antonio González Rodríguez || 4 || 0 || 0 || 0 || 4 || 0
|-
|9 || || FW ||Joël Tshibamba || 4 || 0 || 1 || 0 || 5 || 0
|-
|11 || || MF ||Luís Boa Morte || 2 || 0 || 0 || 0 || 2 || 0
|-
|12 || || DF ||Cyril Kali || 2 || 0 || 0 || 0 || 2 || 0
|-
|13 || || DF ||Naim Aarab || 3 || 0 || 0 || 0 || 3 || 0
|-
|17 || || FW ||Antonios Vouzas || 2 || 0 || 0 || 0 || 2 || 0
|-
|18 || || MF ||Fabricio Poci || 4 || 0 || 0 || 0 || 4 || 0
|-
|20 || || DF ||Nikos Karanikas || 4 || 0 || 0 || 0 || 4 || 0
|-
|24 || || FW ||Zequinha || 6 || 0 || 0 || 0 || 6 || 0
|-
|26 || || DF ||Dimitrios Kolovetsios || 5 || 0 || 0 || 0 || 5 || 0
|-
|27 || || DF ||Alexandros Galitsios  || 1 || 0 || 0 || 0 || 1 || 0
|-
|30 || || MF ||Césinha || 1 || 0 || 1 || 0 || 2 || 0
|-
|33 || || MF ||Athanasios Papageorgiou || 2 || 0 || 0 || 0 || 2 || 0
|-
|44 || || FW ||Nikola Grubješić || 1 || 1 || 0 || 0 || 1 || 1
|-
|55 || || MF ||Manolis Psomas || 4 || 1 || 0 || 0 || 4 || 1
|-
|75 || || GK ||Chrisostomos Michailidis || 1 || 0 || 0 || 0 || 1 || 0
|-
|77 || || DF ||Panagiotis Katsiaros || 4 || 1 || 0 || 0 || 4 || 1
|-
|92 || || MF ||Savas Siatravanis || 1 || 0 || 0 || 0 || 1 || 0
|-
|colspan="3"|
|TOTALS
|68
|5
|3
|0
|71
|5
|-

Sponsor
 OPAP

References

Larissa
Athlitiki Enosi Larissa F.C. seasons